Keith McHenry is a co-founder of Food Not Bombs. He also co-founded Homes Not Jails and contributed to the founding of the Independent Media Center.

Early life 
McHenry was born in Frankfurt, West Germany, in 1957, where his father was
stationed in the army. The family then moved to Logan, Utah while his
father got his master's degree at Utah State. Keith’s father became a
park ranger in the National Park Service and the family lived at a number of parks
including Yosemite, Grand Canyon, Big Bend, Shenandoah and Everglades.

Starting in 1975, McHenry attended Boston University, studying painting
and sculpture. He took a class in American history with Howard Zinn. Keith and his
work with Food Not Bombs is mentioned in Zinn's A People’s History of the
United States. Zinn wrote the introduction to McHenry’s first two books.

 Activism 

While at Boston University, McHenry became active with Clamshell Alliance, making several trips to Seabrook, New Hampshire to protest nuclear power. He began to organize actions in cities on the east coast of the United States against nuclear arms and war, while promoting alternative energy and organic gardening.

In 1980, he and others started the first Food Not Bombs chapter in Cambridge, Massachusetts. The group provided entertainment and vegetarian meals in Harvard Square and the Boston Commons after making deliveries of uncooked food to most of the housing projects and shelters in the area.

In 1988, McHenry moved to San Francisco, where he started a second Food Not Bombs group. He was one of nine volunteers arrested for sharing food and literature at Golden Gate Park on August 15, 1988. In the following years, Keith was arrested over 100 times for serving free food in city parks; he spent over 500 nights in jail. He faced 25 years to life in prison under the California Three Strikes Law, but in 1995, Amnesty International and the United Nations Human Rights Commission brought about his release.

He has started Food Not Bombs groups around the world. He gave up his graphics design career to pursue FNB. In 2005, he helped coordinate food relief as well as shipments of clothing and other supplies to the survivors of Hurricane Katrina.

In 2012, he founded the Food Not Bombs Free Skool, which teaches a summer course covering social issues, community organizing, nonviolent social change, cultural events, and sustainable agriculture.

 Controversies 

In 2017, McHenry went on Kevin Barrett's podcast Truth Jihad to discuss the September 11 attacks as a false flag event.

In 2021, McHenry came out as an anti-covid vaccination activist, publishing an anti-vaccination post that said, in part, "...I first wrote a letter on this subject when I received an invitation to attend a meeting forming a new progressive alliance. To participate you had to provide proof of a vaccination or a negative COVID test.  I wrote to invite the progressive community to stand in solidarity with the working class by refusing to meet in facilities that demand proof of participation in the vaccine experiments."

See also
 List of peace activists

 Awards 
Volunteer Center of Santa Cruz County “Be The Difference Award” 2017
American Civil Union  “Hammer of Justice Award” 2017
The Supreme Master Ching Hai International Association “Shining WorldCompassion Award”
Resister of the Year, 1995 
1999 Local Hero Award, San Francisco Bay Guardian 
2012 Noam Chomsky Award, Justice Studies Association

Publications
Food Not Bombs: How to Feed the Hungry and Build Community - 1992
HUNGRY FOR PEACE: How you can help end poverty and war with Food Not Bombs 2011The Anarchist Cookbook'' - 2015

ARCHIVES
Keith McHenry/Food Not Bombs Archives
University of Victoria Special Collections and University Archives

References 

American anarchists
American democracy activists
American anti-war activists
DIY culture
Organic gardeners
People from Logan, Utah
People from Barnstable County, Massachusetts